The 2018 Alsco 300 was the 17th stock car race of the 2018 NASCAR Xfinity Series season and the 18th iteration of the event. The race was held on Friday, July 13, 2018, in Sparta, Kentucky, at Kentucky Speedway, a 1.5-mile (2.41 km) tri-oval speedway. The race took the scheduled 200 laps to complete. At race's end, Christopher Bell of Joe Gibbs Racing would come back from a spin early in the race to win his third career NASCAR Xfinity Series win and his second of the season. To fill out the podium, Daniel Hemric of Richard Childress Racing and Kyle Busch of Joe Gibbs Racing would finish second and third, respectively.

Background 

Kentucky Speedway is a 1.5-mile (2.4 km) tri-oval speedway in Sparta, Kentucky, which has hosted ARCA, NASCAR and Indy Racing League racing annually since it opened in 2000. The track is currently owned and operated by Speedway Motorsports, Inc. and Jerry Carroll, who, along with four other investors, owned Kentucky Speedway until 2008. The speedway has a grandstand capacity of 117,000. Construction of the speedway began in 1998 and was completed in mid-2000. The speedway has hosted the Gander RV & Outdoors Truck Series, Xfinity Series, IndyCar Series, Indy Lights, and most recently, the NASCAR Cup Series beginning in 2011.

Entry list

Practice

First practice 
The first practice session was held on Thursday, July 12, at 4:05 PM EST, and would last for 45 minutes.

Second and final practice 
The second and final practice session, sometimes referred to as Happy Hour, was held on Thursday, July 12, at 6:05 PM EST, and would last for 45 minutes.

Qualifying 
Qualifying was held on Friday, July 13, at 5:05 PM EST. Since Kentucky Speedway is under 2 miles (3.2 km), the qualifying system was a multi-car system that included three rounds. The first round was 15 minutes, where every driver would be able to set a lap within the 15 minutes. Then, the second round would consist of the fastest 24 cars in Round 1, and drivers would have 10 minutes to set a lap. Round 3 consisted of the fastest 12 drivers from Round 2, and the drivers would have 5 minutes to set a time. Whoever was fastest in Round 3 would win the pole.

No drivers would fail to qualify.

Full qualifying results

Race results 
Stage 1 Laps: 45

Stage 2 Laps: 45

Stage 3 Laps: 110

References 

2018 NASCAR Xfinity Series
NASCAR races at Kentucky Speedway
July 2018 sports events in the United States
2018 in sports in Kentucky